A quarter panel (British English: rear wing) is the body panel (exterior surface) of an automobile between a rear door (or only door on each side for two-door models) and the trunk (boot) and typically wraps around the wheel well. The similar front section between the door and the hood (bonnet) is called a fender (front wing), and may sometimes also be referred to as a quarter panel.  Quarter panels are typically made of sheet metal, but are sometimes made of fiberglass, carbon fiber, or fiber-reinforced plastic.
 
A quarter panel is typically a welded-on component of the unibody structure. Replacement of a sheet metal quarter panel typically requires it to be cut off the vehicle and a replacement part to be welded (or sometimes bonded) to the vehicle. Due to the high amount of specialized labor, a quarter panel may often be repaired rather than replaced by hammering the damaged area to a relatively flat surface and then applying a body filler to smooth out the damaged area to match the original surface. The panel is then usually painted and often clear coated.

See also
Injection molding
Quarter glass

References

Automotive body parts